Detective Joe Fontana is a fictional character portrayed by actor Dennis Farina on NBC's long-running drama series Law & Order.

Character overview
Joe Fontana is a homicide detective in the show's 27th Detective Squad of the New York City Police Department. Fontana—portrayed by Dennis Farina—is partnered with Det. Ed Green and for a brief time, with Det. Nick Falco while Green recovers from a gunshot wound. He is commanded by Lt. Anita Van Buren.

The name "Fontana" comes from Homicide: Life on the Street producer Tom Fontana, a close friend of Law & Order producer Dick Wolf.

Personality
Detective Fontana brings a unique and valuable perspective to the show, based on his experience working in another city. He hails from the Little Italy neighborhood of Chicago and speaks fluent Italian. He was an officer of the Chicago Police Department (as was Farina himself) before coming to New York. He left his posting in Chicago because of a conflict with a superior officer, although he refuses to elaborate further.  He has never been married. Before partnering with Green, Fontana also worked with a homicide squad in The Bronx.

Besides his Chicago experience and background, Fontana's character also lends a notably different image to the depiction of police officers in Law & Order.  He is known on the show for his flashy lifestyle:— he drives a silver Mercedes-Benz SL500, is fond of impeccably tailored suits and made-to-measure shirts that are perfectly color-coordinated, and often carries a 'walking-around' money roll of several thousand dollars. That initially causer suspicion with his new co-workers, who wonder how he can afford those expensive things on his salary; apparently, they are later satisfied with his honesty, though it‘s never explained exactly how he gets such large amounts of money. Fontana's penchant for fancy things even escalates to a character shtick throughout several episodes.  On multiple occasions, he bemoans job-related damage to expensive articles of clothing. In one episode, he tramples through the deep snow to look for evidence in a forest, and says, "Ugh, there goes a perfectly good pair of Gucci loafers." Although Fontana is shown to pay a great deal of attention to his appearance, he does have his limits; in one episode, for example, when he sees a woman who died after having liposuction, he says he would rather go on the South Beach Diet.

Fontana was originally portrayed as having a very dry sense of humour, but this made him unpopular with fans, so he was given a livelier one.

Character highlights
Fontana gets off to a rocky start with Green, who is still getting over the retirement of his old partner, Lennie Briscoe. Owing to Fontana's manner and apparent wealth, Green wonders if Fontana is a "wise guy" (mobster) or a crooked cop. Given time, however, Green warms up to Fontana, and the two establish a strong partnership. Fontana compliments Green on his appearance, and alludes to former partners not being "smooth." Green finds himself caught in the middle of a fight between Fontana and Van Buren more than once. Fontana also mentions he had problems with his former boss, hoping he will eventually warm up to Van Buren. On several occasions, his unabashed style also created conflicts with Executive Assistant District Attorney Jack McCoy. He never married, claiming that he was too old.

In 1995, he started a two-year investigation into the murder of 12-year-old Sara Dolan. Convinced that her father was involved, Fontana does not let go of the case until another murderer confesses to the crime. Fontana questioned his original judgment after extensive investigation, leading to the actual killer being convicted after Mr. Dolan testifies in court. Publicly, Fontana claimed to have no regrets about his original belief in Mr. Dolan's guilt because it was reasonable in light of the facts he had during the original investigation. He later visited Mr. Dolan and tried to apologize only to be turned away. At the time, his partner was Detective Sallone, who had died by 2005.

In 2006, he becomes entangled with his department when he repeatedly dunks a kidnapping/bank robbery suspect's head into the toilet to force him to tell him where his kidnapped victim (a little girl) is.  The evidence thus recovered is nearly thrown out, but thanks to ADA Alexandra Borgia's efforts, Fontana is exonerated, and the suspect is found guilty.

Fontana is in touch with his Italian background, keeping a small Italian flag on his desk, next to the flag of Chicago. He mentions traveling to Italy, and is fluent in the Italian language. To gain a witness's trust, he falsely claims to have served in the Vietnam War on several occasions.

Fontana from time to time uses the phrase "We're authorized" or "I'm authorized" when dealing with people from whom he needs something (such as medical records or access into a room) and who are hesitant to give him what he wants. It is usually successful, and the term became a popular catchphrase associated with the character.

He strongly supports the Iraq War and believes that the Abu Ghraib torture and prisoner abuse scandal was blown out of proportion. He enjoys hunting. During his childhood, he often hunted deer with his uncle.

Fontana carries a .357 Magnum Smith & Wesson Model 19 snub-nosed revolver as his service weapon.  He was the last detective on the show to carry a revolver rather than a semi-automatic pistol.  He also was one of the few detectives to fire his weapon in the line of duty during an episode.

Fontana's departure from the show comes when he retires and is replaced by Green as a senior detective.

Awards and decorations
The following are the medals and service awards worn by Joe, as seen in "Gunplay" (season 15, episode 5).

Credits

References

Law & Order characters
Fictional characters from Chicago
Fictional New York City Police Department detectives
Television characters introduced in 2004
Crossover characters in television
Fictional Italian American people

pt:Joe Fontana